Magalie Vaé is the stage name of Magalie Bonneau, a French singer born on 6 January 1987 in Gonesse (Val-d'Oise). She was the winner of the fifth series of the French Star Academy TV talent show.

Biography
Vaé grew up in Le Thillay, in Val-d'Oise. In September 2005, she was selected to participate to Star Academy France. Four months later she ended up winning one million euros and a record deal to release her debut studio album. On 6 February 2006, Magalie went to Canada to record her album, produced by Rick Allison. The first single, Je ne suis qu'une chanson (I am but a song) was released a month later. Her self-titled album was released on 3 April 2006 to generally positive reviews.

In 2009 the French press reported that Magalie's second album had been recorded for over a year but got pushed back due to contractual disagreements with Universal Music.

In 2010, Vaé signed with Midlands Artistic. Her second album was scheduled for release in 2011. In January 2011, she released the single "L'homme shampooing", followed by "La nausée" in May. In November 2011, she gave birth to her first child. Her second album Métamorphoses was finally released in February 2014. A third single, "La Fièvre acheteuse", was released in January 2015.

Discography

Albums

Singles

References 

1987 births
Living people
People from Gonesse
French-language singers
Star Academy winners
Star Academy (France) participants
Vae, Magalie
21st-century French singers
21st-century French women singers